In physics, an orbit is the gravitationally curved path of one object around a point or another body.

Orbit may also refer to:

Computing
 ORBit, an object request broker (ORB) for CORBA
 Orbit Downloader, a download manager and malware application for Windows

Science, technology and mathematics
 Orbit (anatomy), the socket in the skull that contains the eye
 Orbit (control theory), a particular case of the notion of orbit in group theory
 Orbit (dynamics), in dynamical systems
 Orbit (group theory), in group theory
 Orbit Semiconductor, a semiconductor manufacturing company

Arts, entertainment, and media

Literature
 Orbit (anthology series), a series of original science fiction anthologies, published between 1966–1980
 Orbit (journal), an academic journal of eye disorders and surgery
 Orbit Science Fiction, a five issue science fiction anthology series, published between 1953–1954
 Orbit, a 1982 novel by Thomas Block, author of the novel Mayday (1979)
 Orbit, a 2006 novel by John J. Nance

Music
 Orbit (American band)
 Orbit (William Orbit album)
 Orbit (Rob Brown, Guerino Mazzola and Heinz Geisser album)
 Orbit (scratch), a DJ technique
 Orbit (Japanese group), a Japanese-South Korean boy group
 Orbit, the fandom name of South Korean girl group Loona

Other media
 Orbit: Earth's Extraordinary Journey, a three-part series on BBC Two
 Orbit, a character in the TV series Rob the Robot
 "Orbit", an episode of Blake's 7
 Orbit, a fictional airline in Flight Simulator X
 The Orbit, a blog hosting site co-founded by Greta Christina

Brands and enterprises
 Orbit (gum), a brand of chewing gum manufactured by the Wrigley Company
 Orbit Books, a UK-based publisher of science fiction books and fantasy books
 Orbit Communications Company, a former DBS satellite service in the Middle East
 Orbit Instrument Corporation, developer of an early trackball device for flight control desks
 Orbit Irrigation Products, a manufacturer of consumer and professional irrigation and home improvement products
 Virgin Orbit, part of the Virgin Group responsible for satellite launches

Other uses
 ArcelorMittal Orbit, a steel sculpture and observation tower in East London
 William Orbit, an atmospheric techno composer
 Orbit Group, a UK housing association
 Orbit (horse), a Thoroughbred racehorse
 Orbit (mascot), the mascot of Major League Baseball's Houston Astros

See also
 Orbital (disambiguation)
 Orbiter (disambiguation)
 Orbite Technologies
 Orbitz (disambiguation)
 Orbot